Oeme rigida is a species of beetle in the family Cerambycidae. It was described by Say in 1826.

References 

Oemini
Beetles described in 1826